

Measures of the National Assembly for Wales

|-
| {{|Learner Travel (Wales) Measure 2008|cyshort=Mesur Teithio gan Ddysgwyr (Cymru) 2008|nawm|2|10-12-2008|maintained=y|url=mesur-teithio-gan-ddysgwyr-cymru-learner-travel-wales-measure|A Measure of the National Assembly for Wales to make provision about the travel of persons receiving primary, secondary or further education or training to and from schools or other places where they receive it; and for connected purposes.|cylong=Mesur gan Gynulliad Cenedlaethol Cymru i wneud darpariaeth ynghylch teithio gan bersonau sy'n cael addysg gynradd, addysg uwchradd neu addysg bellach neu hyfforddiant i ysgolion neu i fannau eraill lle y maent yn cael addysg neu hyfforddiant, ac oddi yno; ac at ddibenion cysylltiedig.}}
}}

References

Wales law-related lists